97X might refer to:

 97X Kelowna RapidBus, a Kelowna BC bus route
 Saab 9-7X, a car model
 WOXY.com, an Internet radio station known as 97X: The Future of Rock and Roll
 WOXY (FM), a radio station (97.7 FM) licensed to Mason, Ohio, United States
 WSUN (FM), an FM radio station in Tampa Bay, Florida known as 97X
 WXLP, a radio station from the Quad Cities area of Iowa and Illinois known as 97X